2-Octanol (octan-2-ol, 2-OH) is an organic compound with the chemical formula . It is a colorless oily liquid that is poorly soluble in water but soluble in most organic solvents. 2-Octanol  is classified fatty alcohol. A secondary alcohol, it is chiral.

Production 
2-Octanol is produced commercially by base-cleavage of ricinoleic acid. The coproduct is a mixture of sebacic acid. Castor oil, which consists mainly of triglycerides of ricinoleic acid, is the main feedstock.

Uses
2-Octanol is mainly used as:
 Flavor
 low-volatility solvent : Diverses Resins (Paints & Coatings, Adhesives, Inks, etc.), Agrochemicals, Mineral Extraction, etc....
 Defoaming agent : Pulp & Paper, Oil & Gas, Cement, Coatings, Coal, etc.
 a frother in mineral flotation
 wetting agent

It can also be used as a chemical intermediate for production of various other chemicals: 
 Surfactants (ethoxylates, sulfates, ether sulfates, etc.), 
 Cosmetic emollients esters (palmitate, adipate, maleate, stearate, myristate, etc.),
 Plasticizers (acrylates, maleates, etc.),
 Pesticides: Dinocap 
 Lubricants: Zinc dithiophosphate (ZDDP)
 Fragrances (salicylate)
Used in the manufacturing of perfumes and disinfectant soaps
Used to prevent foaming and as a solvent for fats and waxes
Used to examine and control Essential Tremor and other types of involuntary neurological tremors

See also
 1-Octanol

Notes

References 
 http://www.agrobiobase.com/fr/annuaire/bioproduits/chimie-formulation-synthese/2-octano

Fatty alcohols
Alkanols